Jeremy Yablonski (born March 21, 1980) is a Canadian former professional ice hockey right winger. Primarily a hockey enforcer, Yablonski is a six time, novice Golden Gloves boxing champion. After his professional hockey career, Yablonski went on to obtain his Master in International Business.

Playing career
Yablonski first played for the St. Louis Blues, and received a five-minute major for fighting Todd Fedoruk. From there, Yablonski continued a 15-year career in professional hockey as an enforcer. Playing for Nashville Predators NHL/AHL, Ottawa Senators NHL/AHL, NY Islanders NHL/AHL, and Vityaz KHL, Yablonski made a huge impact on the ice with his high energy play and willingness to protect his teammates. Yablonski won the Calder Cup in the AHL and the Kelly Cup in the ECHL.

Jeremy Yablonski fought in his first professional mixed martial arts competition on May 12, 2007, at XFS (Extreme Fight Series) 5, knocking his opponent out in 19 seconds of the first round. Yablonski improved in XFS-6 on June 14, 2007 by knocking his opponent out in 17 seconds of the first round. Jeremy Yablonski confirmed his signing with Vityaz Chekhov on July 24, 2011.

In 2013, he expressed interest in gaining first Polish, and then Ukrainian dual-citizenship in order to play for the Ukrainian national hockey team.

On December 31, 2021, Yablonski came out of retirement and signed with the Idaho Steelheads of the ECHL.

Career statistics

References

External links

 Yablonski vs Pudzianowski. Interview PL

1980 births
Binghamton Senators players
Bridgeport Sound Tigers players
Canadian ice hockey left wingers
Canadian ice hockey right wingers
Cincinnati Mighty Ducks players
Edmonton Ice players
Sportspeople from Meadow Lake, Saskatchewan
Idaho Steelheads (ECHL) players
Idaho Steelheads (WCHL) players
Kootenay Ice players
Living people
Milwaukee Admirals players
Ontario Reign (ECHL) players
Peoria Rivermen (ECHL) players
Phoenix Mustangs players
St. Louis Blues players
Undrafted National Hockey League players
Worcester IceCats players
Ice hockey people from Saskatchewan
Canadian male mixed martial artists